On The Water is a monthly American fishing and boating magazine, covering both freshwater and saltwater topics.  The majority of its articles are submitted by freelance authors, usually local fishermen and charter-boat captains.  On the Water publishes three versions of the magazine, a New England edition a New York edition and a New Jersey edition.

History 
First published in May 1996, On The Water began as a local black and white magazine covering fishing and boating on Cape Cod, Massachusetts.  With a growing audience, the magazine expanded regionally to offer coverage for all of New England in 1998; taking on the subtitle "The Angler's Guide to New England" to reflect the change.  The split to three editions occurred with the Nov/Dec 2017 issue.

Color printing 
During the magazine's first seven years of publication only the cover was printed in full color, with the articles in black and white.

New York and New Jersey edition 
In March 2009, On The Water launched a New York and New Jersey edition offering coverage of the New York and New Jersey area.  With the expansion, the subtitle "The Angler's Guide to New England" was shortened to "The Angler's Guide" on both issues and regionally identified on the cover.

Television 
With the success of the magazine, On The Water began taping a complementary television show in 2002.  Titled "On the Water: Fishing New England," the first season aired in 2004. It has since been renamed "On The Water TV".

The show is filmed and produced by On The Water staff, covering both freshwater and saltwater fishing topics.  Although the show features a wide range of fishing and locations, each episode is usually centered on a targeted species or specific location.  The show will often feature guests with a certain expertise in the episode's topic, who provide informational tips and offer advice.

Striper Cup 
In 2006, On The Water introduced its annual fishing tournament dubbed "The Striper Cup," named so for its targeted species the striped bass. The 2006 inaugural Striper Cup ran from May 1 to September 17 and saw over 2,000 fishermen participate.

The tournament begins in early May and lasts throughout the summer, culminating in the year-end awards ceremony known as "Striper Fest" in September.  The aim of the contest is to catch the heaviest possible fish rather than the most, so as to prevent overfishing.  Anglers can choose to participate individually or as part of a team in the shore division, boat division, or both.  Prizes are awarded to weekly, monthly, and overall winners who catch and weigh the largest fish.  In addition every participant is entered in a random drawing to win one of the grand prizes.

Notes

References 
 .
 .

External links 
OnTheWater.com

Sports magazines published in the United States
Monthly magazines published in the United States
Magazines established in 1996
Hunting and fishing magazines
Boating magazines
Magazines published in Massachusetts